The healthcare system in Chile is a mixed system that combines both public and private provision of health services. The public system is called Fondo Nacional de Salud (FONASA) and is funded by taxes, providing free or subsidized care for those who cannot afford private health insurance. The private system is composed of various insurance providers (ISAPRE) and healthcare facilities, which offer more extensive services to those who can afford to pay.

History

Chile was among the first Latin American countries to introduce a health care system for the middle class funded through mandatory salary deductions, similar to the Bismarckian welfare state. In the 1950s, it established a national health care system led by the Fondo Nacional de Salud (FONASA). However, during the last decade of the military dictatorship, a two-tier system emerged as people were allowed to opt out and purchase private health insurance from private insurance companies called Instituciones de Salud Previsional (ISAPRE) for treatment at private clinics and hospitals, which could cost up to twice as much.

From 1990, the civilian government increased public funding for hospitals without implementing further reforms for over a decade. In the early 2000s, President Ricardo Lagos strengthened the public sector. Private health care became increasingly expensive and only covered 19% of the population as of 2015, down from a peak of 26%. 

The Explicit Guarantee System (Acceso Universal con Garantías Explícitas, or AUGE) was developed, which provides several guarantees for 56 health problems for the insured. It outlines clinical guidelines and sets a maximum cap for out-of-pocket expenses and designated waiting times, beyond which private providers become an option. While the Lagos reform helped reduce mortality rates, particularly for communicable diseases and even myocardial infarction, it did so at the expense of chronic diseases. In 2010, the Constitutional Court of Chile declared the private insurance system's premiums adjustments for health risk by age and gender as discriminatory, disallowed it, but did not suggest an alternative mechanism. Health care consumer satisfaction has been decreasing since 2007 and reached its lowest point in 2014.

Healthcare system
All workers and pensioners in Chile are required to pay 7% of their income for health insurance, with the exception of the poorest pensioners who are exempt from this payment. Workers who choose not to join an Isapre are covered by Fonasa. Fonasa also covers those receiving unemployment benefits, uninsured pregnant women, the dependent family of insured workers, those with mental or physical disabilities, and the poor or indigent.

Fonasa beneficiaries have the option to use public or private health facilities, as long as the private health facility or health professional is associated with Fonasa in one of three pricing levels. Since September 1, 2022, the cost is free for all beneficiaries when choosing public health facilities.

The level of protection offered by ISAPREs depends on the worker's income and medical risk, which is estimated by factors such as age, family medical history, and sex (although the Constitutional Court of Chile declared risk determination based on sex and age to be unconstitutional in August 2010). This may result in an affiliate needing to seek treatment under Fonasa when a particular service or health condition is not covered by their Isapre. On average, Isapre participants pay 9.2% of their income toward health insurance, with the additional paid over the required 7% being voluntary and paid to increase the benefits available. Almost 60% of payers are in the top two quintiles of income, while only 7% are in the bottom quintile. Isapres often use networks of providers to offer discounted benefits and shorter wait times for services. Fonasa, on the other hand, uses lower cost public hospitals and can offer a broader benefit package for the same cost. The trade-off is accessibility, as the waiting time for services can be substantial.

Over 50% of the public sector health budget in Chile is raised through taxation, which goes to the public social security system and Fonasa plans to help cover expenses. Isapres, on the other hand, cover all expenses using only the contributions of their members.

Auge plan
There are currently 80 high-mortality pathological conditions that have special guarantees for both Isapre and Fonasa affiliates. The Auge (from the Spanish Acceso Universal con Garantías Explícitas, or "Universal Access with Explicit Guarantees") or Ges (Garantías Explícitas en Salud, or "Explicit Guarantees in Healthcare") plan includes four guarantees in relation to these illnesses:

 Access: individuals will be able to receive attention from a network of providers near their place of residence,
 Opportunity: there is a maximum pre-established time limit to receive attention (both initial attention and after the diagnosis),
 Quality (to become enforceable from 1 July 2013): services will follow technical requirement standards that will be established based on medical evidence, and
 Financial coverage: payment to providers cannot be an obstacle to attention. There will be a maximum copayment of 20% of the cost, with the total not to exceed one month of income for the family in a year.

Resources
As of December 22, 2014, the Ministry of Health registered 425 hospitals in Chile, which fall under two administrative spheres - the Regional Ministry of Chile (SEREMI Secretaría Regional Ministerial de Chile) and the National Health Care System (Sistema Nacional de Servicios de Salud). The SEREMI is responsible for 54% (230) of hospitals, while the National Health Care System is responsible for the remaining 46% (195).

Of these hospitals, 30% (127 hospitals) are located in Santiago, the capital city and most populous region of the country, which accounts for 36% of the population.

Beneficiaries
Beneficiaries, as of 2017.

See also
 Ministry of Health (Chile)
 List of hospitals in Chile
 Water supply and sanitation in Chile

References

External links
 World Health Organization: Chile